Indian Valley High School was a high school in Lewistown, Pennsylvania. It administered up to 1000 students. Its mascot was the Indian Valley Warrior. After districtwide restructuring the school was converted into an 8-9 junior high in 2011.

Sources 
Official Site
Yellow Pages

High schools in Pennsylvania
2011 disestablishments in Pennsylvania
Educational institutions disestablished in 2011